The P-class trams were a class of trams operated on the Sydney tram network.

History
Between 1921 and 1929, 258 P class trams were built by Randwick Tramway Workshops, Meadowbank Manufacturing Company, and the Walsh Island Dockyard. As with the preceding O class trams, the P class were cross bench cars with 80 seat capacity. They were a big improvement over the O-class in that all compartments offered protection from bad weather on both sides of the bodies when running. Fitted with folding canvas doors in each compartment, conductors only had to push open one half of a door.

The P-class trams were based at all depots on the main system except Rushcutters Bay, but worked to the Sydney Stadium, just past the depot between 1947 and 1959 out of Waverley and Dowling Street for special events, plus out to Watsons Bay for picnic specials. Most were withdrawn in 1959/1960. Four (1517 & 1573 at Randwick Tramway Workshops and 1562 & 1582 Eveleigh Railway Workshops) were refitted with the same windows, centre door and internal layout as the R1 class.

Preservation
Six have been preserved:
1497, 1517 and 1573 at the Sydney Tramway Museum
1729 (first tram to North Bondi) under restoration at the Sydney Tramway Museum
1501 previously sleeping quarters at a ‘Tram-O-Tel’ in Lightning Ridge now under restoration for Sydney Tramway Museum at Bendigo Tramways
1700 at the Seashore Trolley Museum, Maine

References

Further reading

External links

Trams in Sydney
Tram vehicles of Australia